The International Year of Basic Sciences for Sustainable Development was proclaimed by the 76th session of the United Nations General Assembly 2 December 2021 for 2022, stressing that the applications of basic sciences are vital for advances in medicine, industry, agriculture, water resources, energy planning, environment, communications and culture, and that basic sciences rupture technologies respond to the needs of humankind by providing access to information and increasing societal well-being, and promoting peace through improved collaboration toward Sustainable Development Goals (SDGs). 

The official opening ceremony of the year took place in UNESCO headquarters in Paris on 8 July 2022. The official closure is planned to take place at CERN in Geneva on 15 December 2023.  

The International Union of Pure and Applied Physics (IUPAP) and 28 other science unions and organizations constituted a Steering Committee, chaired by Michel Spiro with vice chairs Jean Trần Thanh Vân, and Prajval Shastri, which goal from 2017 was to promote the proclamation by the United Nations General Assembly of 2022 as the International Year for Basic Science for Sustainable Development.

Over 80 other organizations, among them many national science academies and their networks, are also supporting the initiative.

UNESCO acts as the lead agency and focal point for the Year. The programme for the Year is developed in collaboration with other relevant entities of the United Nations system, IUPAP, CERN, and their associated organizations and federations across the world. So far a series of events have taken place around the world, among others the flagship events “Science, Ethics and Human Development” in Vietnam and  the “World Conference on Basic Sciences and Sustainable Development” in Serbia.

References

External links 

 IYBSSD 2022 web portal
Princess Sumaya bint El Hassan launches IYBSSD 2022

Sustainable Development
2022 in international relations
Science events
2022 in science

2023 in international relations
2023 in science